USS James Madison (SSBN-627), the lead ship of her class of ballistic missile submarine, was the second ship of the United States Navy to be named for Founding Father James Madison (1751–1836), the fourth President of the United States (1809–1817).

Construction and commissioning
The contract to build James Madison was awarded to Newport News Shipbuilding and Dry Dock Company in Newport News, Virginia on 20 July 1961 and her keel was laid down there on 5 March 1962. She was launched on 15 March 1963, sponsored by Mrs. Mary Ellen (Mellon) Monroney, wife of Oklahoma Senator A.S. "Mike" Monroney, and commissioned on 28 July 1964. She was launched with sixteen Polaris A-3 ballistic missiles.

Operational history
After post-shakedown repairs and modification in November and December 1964, James Madison departed on her first deterrent patrol on 17 January 1965. By the end of 1966, she had completed her 10th deterrent patrol, serving in the European area.

In November 1974 she was involved in a collision with a Soviet . The incident occurred when the James Madison was departing Holy Loch in Argyll, Scotland, to take up station and collided with a Soviet submarine waiting outside the port to trail it. Eric Graham, a marine historian from the University of Edinburgh, told BBC Scotland it could have been a diplomatic incident but because it was so deep into the UK home water it was an "embarrassment" that they wanted to keep quiet.

During her first major overhaul, like the rest of her class, Madison was retrofitted with Poseidon C-3 missiles and their associated Mark 88 firecontrol system. Poseidon was replaced by Trident C-4 missiles during a comprehensive overhaul that took place at the Newport News (VA) Shipyard in the early 1980s.

Decommissioning and disposal
The inactivation of James Madison at Mare Island Naval Shipyard at Vallejo, California, began on 18 February 1992. She was decommissioned on 20 November 1992 and struck from the Naval Vessel Register the same day, and her inactivation at Mare Island was completed on 8 December 1992. Her scrapping via the Nuclear-Powered Ship and Submarine Recycling Program in Bremerton, Washington, was completed on 24 October 1997.

References

External links

 

James Madison-class submarines
Cold War submarines of the United States
Nuclear submarines of the United States Navy
1963 ships
Ships built in Newport News, Virginia
United States submarine accidents
Soviet submarine accidents
International maritime incidents
Maritime incidents in Scotland
Maritime incidents in 1974
1974 in Scotland
History of Argyll and Bute
1974 disasters in the United Kingdom
Cold War military history of the United Kingdom
Ships named for Founding Fathers of the United States